Uuno Kailas, born Frans Uno Salonen (29 March 1901 – 22 March 1933) was a Finnish poet, writer, and translator. Together with Kaarlo Sarkia, Kailas was the most prominent Finnish poet of the 1930s.

Life 
Kailas was born in  Heinola. After his mother's death, the boy received a strict religious upbringing from his grandmother. He studied in Heinola and occasionally in the University of Helsinki. In 1919, he took part in the Aunus expedition, where his close friend Bruno Schildt was killed.

Kailas' criticism and translations were published in Helsingin Sanomat. His first collection of poetry was Tuuli ja tähkä in 1922.

Kailas served in the army from 1923 until 1925. In 1929, he was hospitalized due to schizophrenia, and he was also diagnosed with tuberculosis. He died in Nice, France in 1933, and was buried in Helsinki.

Works

Poetry 
 Tuuli ja tähkä (Gummerus, 1922)
 Purjehtijat (WSOY, 1925)
 Silmästä silmään (Schildt, 1926)
 Paljain jaloin (Otava, 1928)
 Uni ja kuolema (WSOY, 1931)
 Runoja (poems from poetry collections Paljain jaloin, Purjehtijat, Silmästä silmään, Tuuli ja tähkä and Uni ja kuolema; WSOY, 1932)
 Punajuova (WSOY, 1933)
 Valikoima runoja (WSOY, 1938)
 Isien tie (WSOY, 1941)
 Uuno Kailaan runoja (selection; WSOY, 1963)
 Ja tomust alkaa avaruus (selection; Karisto, 1984)
 Unen, kuoleman ja intohimon lauluja (selection; Otava, 1986)
 Unten maa (selection; Karisto 1989)
 Tuulien laulu (selection; among Saima Harmaja's and Eino Leino's poems; Kirjapaja, 1992)
 Tuulien nousuun (Kirjapaja, 1996)
 Palava laulu (selection; WSOY, 2000)

Short stories
 Novelleja (WSOY 1936)

Translations 
 Leacock, Stephen: Pukinsorkka (Gummerus, 1923)
 Bruhn, Rudolf: Kuuden kerho (Otava 1924)
 Kaunis Saksa (WSOY 1924)
 Rakkauden korkea veisu (Gummerus 1924)
 Rosen, Erwin: Kaikkien valtojen uhalla (Gummerus 1924)
 France, Anatole: Aadamin ensimmäisen vaimon tytär (Kansanvalta 1926)
 Mörne, Arvid: Meren kasvojen edessä (Schildt 1926)
 Scott, Gabriel: Polku (Schildt 1926)
 Södergran, Edith: Levottomia unia (Tulenkantajain osakeyhtiö 1929)
 Kessel, Joseph: Ruhtinasöitä (Näytelmä 1930)
 Tegnér, Esaias: Fritjofin taru (Otava 1932)
 Södergran, Edith: Kohtaamisia (valikoima; WSOY 1982)
 Södergran, Edith: Runoja (WSOY 1942; also known as Kultaiset linnut, Karisto 1990)
 Södergran, Edith: Elämäni, kuolemani ja kohtaloni (among Pentti Saaritsa's ja Aale Tynni's translations; Otava 1994)
 Södergran, Edith: Hiljainen puutarha (Karisto 1994)

Literature 
 Maunu Niinistö: Uuno Kailas: hänen elämänsä ja hänen runoutensa. WSOY, 1956.
 Matti Hälli: Uuno Kailaasta Aila Meriluotoon. Suomalaisten kirjailijain elämäkertoja. WSOY, 1947.
 Uuno Kailas: muistojulkaisu. WSOY, 1933.
 Kalle Achté: Uuno Kailas - runoilija psykiatrin silmin. Yliopistopaino.

References

External links 

 
 
 

1901 births
1933 deaths
People from Heinola
People from Mikkeli Province (Grand Duchy of Finland)
Finnish male poets
Writers from Päijät-Häme
20th-century Finnish poets
20th-century male writers
Finnish translators
Finnish LGBT poets
People with schizophrenia
20th-century deaths from tuberculosis
Tuberculosis deaths in France
20th-century translators
Finnish Army personnel
20th-century Finnish LGBT people